Peter Casper Krossing (August 21, 1793 – September 1, 1838) was a Danish composer. Some of his compositions are  "Overture to the Drama Love's Omnipotence", "Symphony", "Nú Legg Ég Augun Aftur", and "Nu Lukker Sig Mit Øje".

See also
List of Danish composers

References
This article was initially translated from Danish Wikipedia

External links
 
 

Danish male classical composers
Danish classical composers
1793 births
1838 deaths
19th-century Danish composers
19th-century male musicians